Machine Gun is the debut studio album by The Commodores, released on July 22, 1974, on Motown Records.

Singles
The titular lead song has Milan Williams on clavinet, which led the Motown executive Berry Gordy to name the song "Machine Gun" as the clavinet work reminded him of gunfire. The title track peaked at number 7 on the US Billboard R&B Singles charts, while reaching number 22 on the US Billboard Pop Singles charts. 
As a single "Machine Gun" also reached No. 20 on both the UK Singles chart and the Canadian RPM Pop Singles chart.

The second single to be released, "I Feel Sanctified", reached number 12 on the R&B charts, and concerns a man spiritually blessed by his girlfriend's love. The song has Ronald LaPread on bass guitar, while Lionel Richie and William King contributed horn arrangements. The tune has an a cappella introduction with three-way harmonization. Record World said of it "Bangin' out with a Salvation Army drum beat gone funk, the [Commodores] aim for a vocal bullseye." The song was later covered by Wild Cherry.

Track listing

Personnel 
Commodores
 Lionel Richie – vocals, saxophones, keyboards 
 Milan Williams – keyboards, guitars
 Thomas McClary – vocals, guitars
 Ronald LaPread – bass
 Walter Orange – drums, vocals, percussion
 William King – trumpet, percussion

Production 
 Producers – James Anthony Carmichael (Tracks 1, 2, 4, 5, 8 & 10); Commodores (Tracks 1, 2, 4, 5, 8 & 10); Jeffrey Bowen and George Tobin (Track 3); Gloria Jones and Pam Sawyer (Tracks 6 & 7); Clayton Ivey and Terry Woodford (Track 9).
 Arrangements – James Anthony Carmichael (Tracks 1-5, 8 & 10); Commodores (Tracks 1, 2, 4-8 & 10); George Tobin (Track 3); Gloria Jones (Tracks 6 & 7); Clayton Ivey and Terry Woodford (Track 9).
 Horn arrangements on Track 3 – James Anthony Carmichael
 Effects – Cal Harris
 Photography – Jim Britt

Charts

Certifications

References

1974 debut albums
Commodores albums
Albums produced by James Anthony Carmichael
Albums produced by Lionel Richie
Motown albums